Alice Kusi (born 12 January 1995) is a Ghanaian footballer who plays as a midfielder for Serbian club Spartak Subotica and the Ghana national team. She competed for Ghana at the 2018 Africa Women Cup of Nations, playing in three matches.

Club career 
Starting her career in Ghana at Fabulous Ladies, Kusi moved to Lebanese-based Zouk Mosbeh in 2017 one a one-year contract. In her only season in Lebanon, she won the league, cup and Super Cup, and was crowned top scorer of the league. Kusi returned to Fabulous Ladies in 2018 for one year.

On 27 May 2019, Kusi moved to Jordanian champions Shabab Al-Ordon on a one-year contract. She won the inaugural edition of the WAFF Women's Clubs Championship as the tournament's top goalscorer, with nine goals in four matches. 

On 17 January 2020, Kusi returned to Lebanon, signing for Safa mid-2019–20 season. She scored a hat-trick for her new club just three days later, against Stars of South in a 5–0 victory. Kusi ended the season with 13 goals in seven appearances, helping her side come second in the league.

She joined Serbian club Spartak Subotica ahead of the 2021–22 season, featuring in the UEFA Women's Champions League.

Honours 
Zouk Mosbeh
 Lebanese Women's Football League: 2017–18
 Lebanese Women's FA Cup: 2017–18
 Lebanese Women's Super Cup: 2018

Shabab Al-Ordon
 WAFF Women's Clubs Championship: 2019

Individual
 WAFF Women's Clubs Championship top goalscorer: 2019
 Lebanese Women's Football League top goalscorer: 2017–18

References

1995 births
Living people
Ghanaian women's footballers
Women's association football midfielders
Fabulous Ladies F.C. players
Zouk Mosbeh SC footballers
Shabab Al-Ordon Club players
Safa WFC players
ŽFK Spartak Subotica players
Lebanese Women's Football League players
Ghana women's international footballers
Ghanaian expatriate women's footballers
Ghanaian expatriate sportspeople in Lebanon
Ghanaian expatriate sportspeople in Jordan
Ghanaian expatriate sportspeople in Serbia
Expatriate women's footballers in Lebanon
Expatriate women's footballers in Jordan
Expatriate women's footballers in Serbia
Fenerbahçe S.K. women's football players